Jim Holland (born July 4, 1967) is an American former ski jumper. He competed in the 1992 Winter Olympics in Albertville, France and the 1994 Winter Olympics in Lillehammer, Norway.

Biography
A native of Norwich, Vermont, he was a six time U.S. national champion. He is a co-founder and executive chairman of the board of Backcountry.com.

Family life
Holland's brothers Mike Holland and Joe Holland also competed in the Olympic Winter Games in ski jumping and nordic combined respectively.

References

External links 
 
 

American male ski jumpers
1967 births
Living people
People from Norwich, Vermont
Sportspeople from Vermont
University of Vermont alumni
Olympic ski jumpers of the United States
Ski jumpers at the 1992 Winter Olympics
Ski jumpers at the 1994 Winter Olympics